Ji Hyun-woo (born Joo Hyung-tae on 29 November 1984) is a South Korean actor and musician. He was formerly the lead guitarist for Korean indie rock band  and is best known for his leading roles in the cable TV series Queen and I (2012) and KBS2 weekend drama Young Lady and Gentleman (2021-22).

Early life
Ji Hyun-woo was born in Seong-dong gu, Seoul, the younger of two brothers. His brother, Yoon-chae (윤채), is also a named musician as a keyboardist and music producer. Ji hyun-woo remembers his childhood was full of practicing guitar, up to eight hours a day while his brother was practicing piano because their father had wished for them become star musicians in the future.

Career

2003–2012: Beginnings and rising popularity
Ji Hyun-woo officially made his debut as an actor in 2003. His popularity increased in 2004 with the youth drama You Will Know, and sitcom-turned movie Old Miss Diary. He was named the "Nation's Little Brother" due to his popularity.

Besides acting, Ji is also talented musically. He started as a session guitarist for the second album of Korean band Moonchild. Then in 2004, he along with Park Joon-shik (vocals) and Kim Hyun-joong (bass) formed rock band The Nuts.

In 2005 Ji played Danny Zuko in a Korean staging of the musical Grease, which released its cast recording. He has also contributed to the soundtracks of several of his films and television series. The same year, he became a host of the music program Music Bank.

Ji made his big screen debut in the film Fly High (2006).

Ji continued to star on the small and big screen, among them the TV dramas Golden Apple (2005), Over the Rainbow (2006), Merry Mary (2007), My Sweet Seoul (2008), My Precious You (2008), Invincible Lee Pyung Kang (2009), Becoming a Billionaire (2010), and A Thousand Kisses (2011). He also appeared in the films Attack the Gas Station 2 (2009), and Mr. Idol (2011).

In 2011 Ji released his first solo single Crescendo, comprising three songs which Ji wrote and composed, and which was produced by his older brother Ji Hyun-soo who is also a member of rock band N.EX.T.

He was one of the season 2 hosts of Invincible Youth, a variety program based on members of popular girl groups experiencing the rural countryside of Korea.

In 2012, he starred in the fantasy romance Queen and I on cable channel tvN, in which he played a time-traveling Joseon scholar who falls in love with an actress in the 21st century (played by Yoo In-na).

2012–2014: Military service
Ji enlisted for his mandatory military service on 7 August 2012, with the Chuncheon 102nd Reserve Forces. He was due to enlist in July but it was delayed for one month while he recovered from a back injury suffered during the filming of Queen and I.

In January 2013, Ji starred in the military musical The Promise. It was co-produced by the Ministry of National Defense and Korea Musical Theatre Association, to commemorate the 60th anniversary of the signing of the armistice. Running from 9 to 20 January at the National Theater of Korea, the musical is centered around a group of soldiers who keeps a promise made to each other during the 6.25 war.

He was discharged on 6 May 2014.

2014–2019: Return to entertainment
For his first post-army project, Ji was cast as a genius songwriter/musician who helps the heroine become a trot singer despite his distaste for the musical genre, in the romantic comedy series Trot Lovers. Then in 2015, he played a naive, idealistic homeroom teacher who helps a housewife masquerading as a high school student put an end to school violence in Angry Mom. A major turning point in Ji's career followed as the protagonist of the critically acclaimed cable series Songgot: The Piercer, a webtoon adaptation that tackled social injustice when temps are laid off by a big-box store.

In 2016, Ji signed with Dream Tea Entertainment.
He next starred in SBS' thriller Wanted.

In 2017, Ji starred in MBC's weekend drama Bad Thief, Good Thief alongside Seohyun, playing multiple roles in the drama.

In 2018, Ji starred in True Fiction, a black comedy that satirizes politicians. The same year, Ji starred in the medical drama Risky Romance.

In 2019, Ji starred in the romance melodrama Love in Sadness.

In October 2019, Ji Hyun-woo changed his agency from Dream T Entertainment to Lion Heart Entertainment to pursue his musical career as well as his acting career.

2020–present: Pursuing music as well as acting 

In January 2020, Ji Hyun-woo releases the first mini album of the band 사거리 그오빠(SGO). Ji Hyun-woo is the band's leader, vocalist and guitarist.

After that, he filmed the movie Everglow produced by Myung Film. Everglow was screened at BIFF 2020.
In August 2020, he appeared in MBC Every1 drama Lonely enough to love.

During COVID-19 pandemic the band ended their contract with Lion Heart Entertainment. Ji Hyun-woo as an actor still maintains a contract with the agency.

On 10 February 2021, the band SGO's new single album Freesia was released. This single album and even the music video were produced by themselves.
In this single, Ji Hyun-woo decided to use his real name, Hyeong-tae, to distinguish between Hyeong-tae who plays music and Hyun-woo, who is an actor.

On 30 April 2021, SGO released their second single 'You Are so beautiful'. On May 10, 2021, SGO started their official YouTube channel and an Instagram account to promote their music all by themselves.

Later in 2021, Ji joined KBS2 weekend drama Young Lady and Gentleman as the main lead. He plays a 40-year-old corporate chairman and a widower with three kids. The series currently ranks at the 4th place among Top 50 series per nationwide viewers in Korea and logged a national average viewership of 36% for its 32nd episode. His performance earned him Grand Prize (Daesang) at 2021 KBS Drama Awards.

In 2022, Ji will release the single "Shake it Boom", which is a song by his band Sageori Geu Oppa (SGO).<ref>{{cite web|url=https://entertain.naver.com/now/read?oid=311&aid=0001471035|author=Kim No-eul|title=지현우, 가수로 돌아온다…6일 신곡 Shake it boom' 발표|trans-title=Ji Hyun-woo returns as a singer... The new song Shake it boom was released on the 6th|publisher=X-ports News|via=Naver|date=July 5, 2022|access-date=July 5, 2022|language=ko}}</ref>

Personal life

At the press conference for the last episode of Queen and I on 7 June 2012, Ji made the surprise public declaration: "I wanted to make this confession in front of the fans who enjoyed our drama. I sincerely love Yoo In-na.” After days of media frenzy and speculation, the couple were spotted on a date on 17 June 2012. Yoo confirmed their relationship on her radio show on 18 June 2012, saying the two had developed feelings for each other while filming the drama. On 14 May 2014, their respective agencies confirmed in a press release that the couple had broken up.

Filmography

Television series

Film

Television show

Radio program

Musical theatre

Discography
*Note: the whole list below is referenced.

The Nuts
AlbumsThe Nuts (2004)Whispers of Love (2006)Could've Been (2008)Crazy Love (2008)Truth J (2009)

Singles
추억여행 "Travel Memories" (2007)
졸업여행 "Graduation Trip" (2008)
바다에 입맞춤 "Kissing in the Sea" (2009)
Compilation
2008 Ivy Mega Mix Single Collection Vol.1

Solo artist
Cast recordingGrease (musical, 2005)

SoundtrackJi Hyun-woo's Love Letter (From "Over the Rainbow" OST, 2006)
외눈박이 물고기 "One Eyed Fish"
애인을 구합니다
눈물의 크리스마스 "Christmas Tears" (duet with Park Joon-shik, from Old Miss Diary – Movie OST, 2006)
"One&One" (from Merry Mary OST, 2007)
달콤한 나의 도시 "My Sweet City" (from My Sweet Seoul OST, 2008)
본능적으로 "Instinctively" (from tvN Show Show Show Part 1, 2011)
하루종일 "All Day" (from Trot Lovers OST, 2014)
나는 행복한 사람 I'm a Happy Person (from  "Bad Thief, Good Thief" OST, 2017)
"Please Don't Go" (From "Lonely Enough to Love" OST, 2020)

SinglesCrescendo (2011)
 아기 코끼리 "Baby Elephant"
 좋은 중독 "Good Addiction"
 아이야 "Kid"

SGO (사거리 그오빠)

Mini Album NEWS (2020)
 Make up "화장"
 Waiting for you "누가 나 좀" 
 Lie "거짓말" 
 La ventana "창문"

Single Freesia (2021) 
 Freesia
 Freesia (Inst.)

Single You Are so beautiful (2021) 
 You Are so beautiful
 You Are so beautiful (Inst.)

Mini Album Love Line ''(2022)
 Shake it Boom 
 You are so Beautiful
 Tic Tic Tic
 Freesia
 Love Line

Awards and nominations

References

External links
 
 Ji Hyun-woo at Dream Tea Entertainment 
  at Lion Heart Entertainment 

South Korean male television actors
South Korean male film actors
South Korean rock guitarists
1984 births
Living people
People from Seoul
Male actors from Seoul
21st-century guitarists
Sungkyunkwan University alumni